The 2006 Campeon de Campeones was the 41st edition of this Mexican Super Cup football two leg match played by:

 Apertura 2005: Toluca
 Clausura 2006: Pachuca

Match details

References

Mexico - Statistics of season 1988/1989. (RSSSF)
Mexico - Statistics of Mexican Supercup. (RSSSF)

Cam
Campeón de Campeones
September 2006 sports events in Mexico